KLUK (97.9 FM, "Lucky 98") is a radio station broadcasting a classic rock format. Licensed to Needles, California, United States, it serves the entire "Tri-State area" including Lake Havasu, Kingman, Laughlin/Bullhead City and Needles, California.  The station is currently owned by Cameron Broadcasting, Inc. and features TnT Radio Empire, Star in The Afternoon, and Poorman's Morning Rush.  Lucky 98 FM is the only live and local classic rock station in the area.

Translators
KLUK also broadcasts on the following translators:

External links
cameronbroadcasting.com

LUK
LUK
Classic rock radio stations in the United States
Radio stations established in 1991
1991 establishments in California